Alan Riddell is a bilingual labour relations lawyer and partner with the law firm of Soloway Wright LLP in Ottawa, Ontario, Canada. He is a graduate of the University of Toronto and France's Institut d'etudes politiques de Paris.  While still a student, he worked for Progressive Conservative Party of Canada Senator and Foreign Affairs Critic Heath MacQuarrie, and later in the office of Prime Minister Brian Mulroney. As a young lawyer he successfully argued a number of high-profile cases, including the landmark decision of Dagg v. Minister of Finance in the Supreme Court of Canada, which defined the privacy rights of federal public servants under Canada's new Access to Information Act.

In 2004 federal election 

In March 2004, Riddell was approached by the Conservative Party of Canada (CPC) to run as its candidate in the riding of Ottawa South, which was being vacated by Deputy Prime Minister, John Manley.  He handily defeated others, including former Ottawa mayoralty candidate Terry Kilrea, for the 2004 CPC nomination. In the ensuing election, he ran against two nationally known names:  David McGuinty, the younger brother of Ontario Liberal Party Premier Dalton McGuinty, and Monia Mazigh, of the New Democratic Party (NDP), best known as the wife of wrongfully imprisoned Syrian-Canadian Maher Arar.  Although the riding was traditionally Liberal, it was thought that Riddell's background and dynamism, together with voter backlash against Liberal broken promises, gave him a good chance of winning.

By the middle of the campaign, Riddell began to lead McGuinty and Mazigh in the polls, and many believed he would score an upset victory over the Liberals.  In the final days of the campaign, however, urban voters across Ontario shifted away from the Conservatives, thereby ensuring reelection of the Liberal government.  In addition, only a few days prior to the vote, the Ottawa Sun published a damaging front-page story about Riddell, that was later retracted as inaccurate.  Despite this erroneous news story, and the last minute shift in voter support, Riddell finished the election with more than 20,600 votes, the highest number ever recorded by a Conservative candidate in the riding's history, thereby finishing a relatively close second to McGuinty.

After the election was over, the Ottawa Sun published a prominent retraction of its erroneous front-page story about Riddell and expressed regret at "the resulting prejudice to his campaign".

In 2006 federal election 

In May 2005, when it appeared that the Liberal government was about to be defeated and another election called, Riddell was recruited to run in Ottawa South a second time.  In reaction to rumours that he had once worn a World War II German officer's costume to a campus costume party, as a teenage Halloween prank 28 years earlier, Conservative officials initially blocked Riddell's renomination as the Party's candidate.  Riddell's disqualification caused a public outcry from Riddell's supporters across Ottawa, and was quickly assessed by the Conservative Party's National Arbitration Committee.

In August, 2005, the Conservative party arbitration committee overturned that decision after finding that Mr. Riddell had worn a Sgt. Shultz uniform from the TV show Hogan's Heroes as a prank 25 years ago, and should not be barred for a "youthful indiscretion".  This was issued as a binding directive to Party officials, permitting him to be the party's candidate in Ottawa South a second time.

Only three days prior to the 2006 election, which the Conservative Party hoped to win by focusing voter attention on the Liberal government's sponsorship scandal, Riddell stepped aside as the Party's candidate to enable Allan Cutler, the public servant who had blown the whistle on the scandal, to run in his stead in Ottawa South. Party officials issued a Press release thanking Riddell for his gesture and confirming that the Party "looked forward to having him run as its candidate in future elections".  To compensate Riddell for relinquishing the nomination to Cutler, in a move designed to help them win the national campaign, they undertook to repay him his campaign expenses, pursuant to an agreement which Party Executive Director Michael Donison described in writing as legally "binding".  Although Elections Canada later ruled the agreement to be legal, when news of the Party's agreement surfaced in the press, senior Party officials, including Party Leader Stephen Harper, publicly denied its existence.

After the Conservative victory in the election, Conservative Party officials refused to honour the agreement, and Riddell was
eventually forced to apply to the Ontario Superior Court of Justice for a Court Order that it be implemented.

On January 11, 2007, after a two-day court hearing, Judge Denis Power of the Ontario Superior Court of Justice issued a decision confirming that the Party's agreement with Riddell was legally binding, and ordering it to immediately pay Riddell. The Judge ruled that when Riddell had stepped aside for Cutler, he had been "the preferred choice of the clear majority" and that "the evidence, taken as whole, clearly establishes that an agreement was reached".  He concluded that "the crux of the agreement was that Mr. Riddell, the leading contender for the nomination, agreed to voluntarily step aside in favour of Allan Cutler in exchange for which he was to receive some financial compensation for expenses incurred by him in seeking the nomination".

In a news article reporting on this Ontario Superior Court decision, Riddell was quoted as saying that he "remained a loyal Conservative" and that he intended to run again as a candidate for the Party some day.

In November 2007, Riddell, the Conservative Party and the Prime Minister quietly settled the case.  The settlement was announced by a one-sentence joint news release by the Conservative Party and Alan Riddell, issued on an early Saturday morning:  "The Conservative Party of Canada and Alan Riddell announce they have mutually settled all legal proceedings brought by Mr. Riddell against the Conservative Party of Canada and Conservative party officials."

References

Uncited Sources 

"Court hears privacy issue" Edmonton Journal Edmonton, AB. December 8, 1995. pg A.4
"Riding chooses Conservative candidate" Ottawa Citizen Ottawa, ON. March 9, 2004.  pg C.2
"Retraction:Re Alan Riddell." Ottawa Sun. November 28, 2004.
"Turner Pulls Plug on his Tory Campaign:.." Ottawa Citizen July 16, 2005.  pg. E.3
"Ex-Candidate Says Tories blocked his nomination over teen 'prank'"
Ottawa Citizen May 18, 2005 pg. A.12
"Barred Conservative candidate gets second chance" CBC.CA News July 22, 2005 10:35 AM EDT
Eaves, Sutton "Riddell feels voters' wrath for driving while
suspended" Ottawa Citizen. June 21, 2004. pg. A.7
"Press Release" Conservative Party of Canada, November 25, 2005
Butler, Don "Deal Cut with Riddell, e-mails show:" Ottawa Citizen December 6, 2005. pg. A.3 
Turchansky, Lorraine "Harper stands by Cutler's nomination" Ottawa Sun December 5, 2005
Bryden, Joan "Conservatives must pay up to $50,000 to candidate who stepped aside for star" Ottawa Citizen January 13, 2007. pg.
A.5

Conservative Party of Canada candidates for the Canadian House of Commons
Lawyers in Ontario
People from Ottawa
Ontario candidates for Member of Parliament
Living people
Labour lawyers
Year of birth missing (living people)